Piotr Olewiński (born 16 August 1968) is a Polish windsurfer. He competed in the men's Lechner A-390 event at the 1992 Summer Olympics.

References

1968 births
Living people
Polish male sailors (sport)
Polish windsurfers
Olympic sailors of Poland
Sailors at the 1992 Summer Olympics – Lechner A-390
Sportspeople from Gdańsk